The Tugen are a sub tribe of the Kalenjin people alongside the Nandi, Kipsigis, Keiyo, Pokot, Marakwet, Sabaot, Ogiek, Lembus and Sengwer sub-tribes. They occupy Baringo County and some parts of Nakuru County and Elgeyo Marakwet County in the former Rift Valley Province, Kenya. Daniel arap Moi, the second president of Kenya (1978–2002), came from the Tugen sub-tribe. The Tugen people speak the Tugen language. The Tugen population was 197,556 in 2019.

History 
Unlike other Kalenjin sub tribes, Tugen is more diverse in culture and language. Aror and Samor follows Tugen circumcision rites. In terms of language, Aror is more isolated. They have strong connection with Marakwet people and samor have connection with Lembus and Nandi.

Origins 
The oral traditions of the Tugen indicate three areas of origin located north, west and east of the present Tugen homelands. The bulk of the population originated from the west, from a place known as Sumo which is located between Mount Elgon and Cherangany Hills. The northern and eastern migrations came from Suguta (Lake Turkana) and Koilegen (Mount Kenya) and brought with them non-Kalenjin speaking people from northern Kenya and the highlands to the East of the Rift Valley respectively.

Demographics 
The Tugen are further subdivided into two subgroups or sections :
 Arror live in the Highlands of Kabartonjo and the lowlands of Kerio Valley (Barwessa) and Lake Baringo of North Baringo District.
 Samors who live in the wider Kabarnet in Central Baringo district. This is the group from which the second president of Kenya, Daniel Toroitich arap Moi comes.

Culture

Religion 
Traditionally, like other Kalenjin people, the Tugen prayed to a God called Asis (which means 'sun'.) There are also gods namely Chepapkoyo(god of harvest), Cheptengeryan (god of love). Most have converted to Christianity. Islam has flourished in the major towns and it was these towns that some Tugens convert into Islam and adopted Islamic names. There are also pagans among tugen.

Age-sets 
The Tugen social organisation centres on the age set, or ipindo. There are seven age-sets (ipinwek) which are rotational, meaning at the end of one ageset new members of that generation are born. The order is roughly as given below.

Among some Kalenjin peoples, an age-set called Maina exists. However, among the Tugen, this ageset is extinct. Legend has it that the members of this ipindo were wiped out by the Keiyo, in skirmish between the two tribes near present day Cheploch gorge. For fear of a recurrence, the community decided to retire the age-set.

Ipindo was given out at initiation and by simple arrangements, there ought to be one ipindo between a father and a son. For example, a korongoro cannot beget a kipkoimet. The Tugen don't consider a woman to have an ageset, hence she can marry any ageset except that in which her father belongs. The Tugen say "ma tinyei ipin Korgo" meaning they can marry any age set but they have their own ageset like chesiran, masinya, chepigwek Mary " .

Chumo
Sawe
Korongoro
Kipkoimet
Kaplelach
Kipnyigei
Nyongi

Age sub-set (siritie) 

In each age-set, the initiates were bundled into siritie or what can be understood as a 'team'. There are three 'teams' or siritoik in an age-set (ibindo) namely:

Chongin
kapchepsuei
Barnot (literally youth)

Notable people 
 Daniel arap Moi
 Gideon Moi
 Benjamin Chesire Cheboi, the first governor of Baringo County
 Hosea Kiplagat
 Paul Tergat world Marathon champion
 Reuben Chesire - politician, renowned corporate Titan, farmer

References 

Kalenjin
Ethnic groups in Kenya
Baringo County